is a district of Minato ward located in Tokyo, Japan. The district is located between the eastern side of the Yamanote Line train and Tokyo Bay. Shibaura consists mostly of artificial islands created by the excavation of industrial canals in the early 20th century. Formerly a light industrial area, it became famous for its night life during the Japanese asset price bubble period and, since the early 2000s, has become a high-rise residential district.

Economy
Shibaura is the home to a number of major Japanese corporations including:
Toshiba (originally Tokyo Shibaura Electric)
SUMCO
Cosmo Oil Company
Mitsubishi Motors
THK
 FamilyMart
 Yanase
 Bandai Namco Amusement

Rail links
The district is served by Tamachi Station on the Yamanote and Keihin-Tōhoku Lines, and by Shibaura-futō Station of the Yurikamome line. The Yokosuka Line also runs in a tunnel below the district, although there are no stops in the area.

Road links
The Tokyo Expressway system passes through the area, and the central Tokyo side of Route 11 connecting to the Rainbow Bridge terminates at Shibaura Junction.

Education

Minato City Board of Education operates public elementary and junior high schools.

Shibaura 1 chōme 6-16 ban, Shibaura 2-3 chōme, and 4-chōme 20-22-ban are zoned to Shibahama Elementary School (芝浜小学校). Shibaura 4-chōme 1-19-ban are zoned to Shibaura Elementary School (芝浦小学校). The Shibahama Elementary and Shibaura Elementary zones feed into Konan Junior High School (港南中学校). Shibaura 1 chōme 1-5-ban are zoned to Shiba Elementary School (芝小学校) and Mita Junior High School (港区立三田中学校).

References

Districts of Minato, Tokyo